The men's 800 metres event at the 2003 Summer Universiade was held in Daegu, South Korea with the final on 27–30 August.

Medalists

Results

Heats

Semifinals

Final

References
Results
Heat, semifinal results

Athletics at the 2003 Summer Universiade
2003